The Rock Creek Wilderness is a wilderness area comprising  within the Siuslaw National Forest on the Oregon Coast.  It was created in 1984, along with the Drift Creek Wilderness and Cummins Creek Wilderness. The Rock Creek Wilderness has "no developed trails or trailheads."

Topography
Rock Creek Wilderness is characterized by steep slopes, dense forest, and thick brush. Two streams (Rock Creek and Big Creek), separated by a broad ridge, traverse the area and flow westward to the Pacific Ocean.

Vegetation
Rock Creek Wilderness is primarily coniferous rainforest with dense ground cover.  Bigleaf Maple and Red Alder trees line both creeks. Old-growth Douglas-fir can be found in the eastern portion of this area, giving way to old-growth Sitka Spruce closer to the ocean.  Other vegetation include Salal, Salmonberry, Western Swordfern, and rhododendron.

Wildlife
One unique inhabitant of this area is the Oregon silverspot butterfly. These endangered orange-and-brown butterflies can be found on the ridge between the creeks.  Salmon, steelhead, and coastal cutthroat trout migrate upstream along both creeks each year to spawn.

See also
 List of Oregon Wildernesses
 List of U.S. Wilderness Areas
 List of old growth forests

References

Gallery

External links
 Rock Creek Wilderness - National Wilderness Preservation System
 Siuslaw National Forest
 Rock Creek Wilderness - Leisure and Sport Review

Siuslaw National Forest
Wilderness areas of Oregon
Oregon Coast Range
Protected areas of Lane County, Oregon
Oregon Coast
Old-growth forests
IUCN Category Ib
1984 establishments in Oregon
Protected areas established in 1984